Gary Francis Ogilvie (born 1967) is a Scottish former footballer, who played for Sunderland and Airdrieonians. He currently serves as Head of Recruitment for his former youth team, Dundee, from 2022.

After retiring as a professional footballer, Ogilvie became a police officer.

References

External links 

1967 births
Officers in Scottish police forces
Living people
Association football fullbacksDANIEL *
Scottish Football League players
Scottish footballers
Dundee F.C. players
Sunderland A.F.C. players
Airdrieonians F.C. (1878) players
Footballers from Dundee
English Football League players
Scottish police officers
Dundee F.C. non-playing staff